Eutetrapha biscostata is a species of beetle in the family Cerambycidae. It was described by Masao Hayashi in 1994.

References

Saperdini
Beetles described in 1994